Hammered coinage is the most common form of coins produced since the invention of coins in the first millennium BC until the early modern period of c. the 15th–17th centuries, contrasting to the cast coinage and the later developed milled coinage.

History
Hammered coins were produced by placing a blank piece of metal (a planchet or flan) of the correct weight between two dies, and then striking the upper die with a hammer to produce the required image on both sides. The planchet was usually cast from a mold.  The bottom die (sometimes called the anvil die) was usually counter sunk in a log or other sturdy surface and was called a pile. One of the minters held the die for the other side (called the trussel), in his hand while it was struck either by himself or an assistant.

Experimental archeology suggests that a lower die could be expected to last for up to 10,000 strikes depending on the level of wear deemed acceptable. Upper dies seem to have a far greater range of lives with usable lives ranging from just over 100 strikes to nearly 8000 being reported. Combining archaeological evidence with historic records suggests ancient coin producers (in this case the Amphictions at Delphi) could get as many as 47,000 strikes out of an individual die.

In later history, in order to increase the production of coins, hammered coins were sometimes produced from strips of metal of the correct thickness, from which the coins were subsequently cut out. Both methods of producing hammered coins meant that it was difficult to produce coins of a regular diameter. Coins were liable to suffer from "clipping" where unscrupulous people would remove slivers of precious metal since it was difficult to determine the correct diameter of the coin.

Coins were also vulnerable to "sweating", which is when silver coins would be placed in a bag that would be vigorously shaken. This would produce silver dust, which could later be removed from the bag.

Milled coins
The ability to fashion coins from machines (milled coins) caused hammered coins to become gradually obsolete during the 17th century. They were still made in Venice until the 1770s. France became the first country to adopt a full machine-made coin in 1643.

In England, the first non-hammered coins were produced in the reign of Queen Elizabeth I in the 1560s, but while machine-produced coins were experimentally produced at intervals over the next century, the production of hammered coins did not finally end until 1662.

Cast coins
An alternative method of producing early coins, particularly found in Asia, especially in China, was to cast coins using molds. This method of coin production continued in China into the nineteenth century. Up to a couple of dozen coins could be produced at one time from a single mold, when a 'tree' of coins (which often contained features such as a square hole in the centre) would be produced and the individual coins (called cash) would then be broken off.

Hammered coin production

See also
Milled coinage

References

External links
Ancient Minting Process

Numismatics
Currency production methods